Gennaro Armeno (born 12 February 1994) is an Italian professional footballer who plays as a left midfielder.

Club career
He made his Serie C debut for Ischia on 31 August 2014 in a game against Benevento.

On 16 January 2019, he was released from his contract with Novara by mutual consent.

On 5 February 2019, he joined Teramo.

On 19 November 2019, he signed with Serie C club Bisceglie.

References

External links
 

Living people
1994 births
People from Pozzuoli
Footballers from Campania
Association football midfielders
Italian footballers
S.S. Ischia Isolaverde players
Novara F.C. players
Matera Calcio players
Reggina 1914 players
S.S. Teramo Calcio players
A.S. Bisceglie Calcio 1913 players
Serie B players
Serie C players
Serie D players